Arthur L. Jarrett (February 5, 1884 – June 12, 1960) was an American screenwriter and film actor. He wrote for 70 films between 1932 and 1947. He also appeared in 12 films between 1914 and 1950. He was born in Marysville, California, first appearing on stage in A Royal Rival in 1902. He also appeared in the touring company of Abie's Irish Rose in 1944 and on Broadway in The Bad Seed at the Coronet Theatre in 1955. He was the father of Art Jarrett. He died in New York City, aged 76.

External links

1884 births
1960 deaths
Male actors from California
American male screenwriters
American male film actors
American male silent film actors
Male actors from New York City
People from Marysville, California
20th-century American male actors
Screenwriters from California
Screenwriters from New York (state)
20th-century American male writers
20th-century American screenwriters